Ephraim Okechukwu Ikeakor  is an Anglican bishop in Nigeria; he is the current Bishop of Amichi, one of nine within the Anglican Province of the Niger, itself one of 14 provinces within the Church of Nigeria.

Ikeakor was born in Umuguma on 4 May 1966. He went to school in Umuchu before graduating from Nnamdi Azikiwe University. He was ordained in 1997.  He became a Canon in 1998; and an Archdeacon in 2000. He was elected bishop on 12 November 2008; and consecrated on 11 January 2009.

References

20th-century Nigerian Anglican priests
Anglican bishops of Mbamili
21st-century Anglican bishops in Nigeria
People from Owerri
Nnamdi Azikiwe University alumni
1966 births
Living people
Anglican bishops of Amichi
Church of Nigeria archdeacons